This article features the discography of Albanian-American singer and songwriter Bleona.

Albums

Studio albums 

Kam Qejfin Tim (1997)
Nese Me Do Fort (1999) 
S'me Behet Vone (2001) 
Ik Meso Si Dashurohet (2002)
Ti Nuk Di As Me Ma Lyp (2003)
Greatest Hits (2005) 
Boom Boom (2005)   
Mandarin (2007)

Extended plays 

Take It Like A Man (2013)
Take You Over (2015)
Wicked Love (2018)
Monster (2018)
I Don't Need Your Love (2018)

Singles

As lead artist

Notes

References 

Discographies of Albanian artists
Discographies of American artists